Individuals and events related to Uzbekistan in 2023.

Incumbents

Events 
 1 January – Uzbekistan's Latin alphabet transition is completed.
 6 January – State security police in Uzbekistan arrest four people over the deaths of 19 children who consumed a cough syrup product manufactured by Indian drug manufacturer Marion Biotech last week.

Ongoing events 

 COVID-19 pandemic in Uzbekistan

Politics 

 The number of ministries and government agencies in Uzbekistan are expected to be halved in 2023.

Deaths

 18 January – Hakim Zaripov, 98, circus performer, trick rider and horse trainer.

See also 
 Outline of Uzbekistan
 List of Uzbekistan-related topics
 History of Uzbekistan

References 

 
2020s in Uzbekistan
Years of the 21st century in Uzbekistan
Uzbekistan
Uzbekistan